The Chandrapur back-to-back HVDC station is a back-to-back HVDC connection between the western and southern regions in India, located close to the city of Chandrapur. Its main purpose is to export power from the Chandrapur Super Thermal Power Station to the southern region of the Indian national power grid. It is owned by Power Grid Corporation of India.

The converter station consists of two independent poles, each with a nominal power transmission rating of 500 MW.  Both poles were built by GEC-Alstom between 1993 and 1997 and have nominal DC voltage and current ratings of 205 kV, 2475 A.

The close proximity of the two converter stations meant that the control systems needed to be carefully coordinated, a task made more challenging by the fact that the two stations were built by different manufacturers. To address this problem a series of joint simulation studies, involving the control equipment from both converter stations connected to a common simulator, was performed.

On 31 December 2013, the Northern, Eastern and Western grids were synchronised with the Southern regional grid, creating a single synchronous AC grid over the whole of India.   As a result, the converter station is no longer required for its original purpose of asynchronously linking the Western and Southern grids, although it can still be used as an embedded power flow device to help control power flow within the AC system.  The stations could potentially be shifted to elsewhere to export/import power from other countries. Sometimes the excess power fed to the southern grid by this HVDC link is flowing back to Western region through the 765 kV AC lines between Southern grid and the Western grid with futility.

Arrangement and main equipment

Overall arrangement 

Each of the two poles is identical and consists of a back-to-back connection of two 12-pulse bridge converters.  Unusually, no DC smoothing reactors are used.

Each pole is grounded at one of the two DC terminals.

Converter transformers 
Each of the two poles uses three, single-phase, three-winding converter transformers on each side.

Thyristor valves 

The scheme comprises 48 thyristor valves (12 at each end of each pole) and with each thyristor valve including 54 thyristor levels in series.  The thyristors are of 100 mm diameter and are rated at 5.2 kV. The thyristor valves are floor-mounted even though the station is located in a seismically active area.

AC filters and reactive power 

Each side of the station is equipped with a total of 848 MVAr of AC harmonic filters. Each side of each pole is equipped with three, 106 MVAr double-damped filters (tuned to 12th and 24th harmonics) and one, 106 MVAr "C-type" filter (tuned to 5th harmonic). On the Southern side there are also two, 50 MVAr shunt reactors.

Sites

See also
 HVDC Sileru–Barsoor
 Vizag back-to-back HVDC converter station

References

External links 

 https://web.archive.org/web/20121013104458/http://www.powergridindia.com/PGCIL_NEW/home.aspx Power Grid Corporation of India
 Alstom Grid Website

Electric power transmission infrastructure in India
Converter stations
Energy in Maharashtra
Energy in Andhra Pradesh
Chandrapur district
1997 establishments in Maharashtra
Energy infrastructure completed in 1997